Robert Arthur Hulse (born 5 November 1948) is an English former professional footballer who played in the Football League for Stoke City.

Career
Hulse was born in Crewe and played for Northwich Victoria before been given a professional contract with Stoke City for the 1967–68 season. He played in just two matches for Stoke one at the start of the season and one near the end before being released.

Career statistics

References

English footballers
Stoke City F.C. players
Northwich Victoria F.C. players
English Football League players
1948 births
Living people
Sportspeople from Crewe
Association football forwards